Paracimmerites nanus is a species of beetle in the family Carabidae, the only species in the genus Paracimmerites.

References

Trechinae